Jiutai is one of seven districts of the prefecture-level city of Changchun, the capital of Jilin Province, Northeast China. Coal mining also is present in Jiutai. It borders Dehui to the north, Erdao District to the southwest, Kuancheng District to the west, as well as the prefecture-level city of Jilin to the south and east.

Administrative divisions
There are five subdistricts, nine towns, and two ethnic townships.

Subdistricts:
Tuanjie Subdistrict, Gongnong Subdistrict, Nanshan Subdistrict, Yingcheng Subdistrict, Huoshiling Subdistrict

Towns:
Tumenling, Xiyingcheng, Mushihe, Qitamu, Shanghewan, Yinmahe, Chengzijie, Xinglong, Weizigou

Townships:
Hujia Hui Ethnic Township, Mangka Manchu Ethnic Township

Climate

References

External links

Changchun
County-level divisions of Jilin
Cities in Jilin